Gregory Abbey, also known under the alias Frank Frankson, is an American voice actor who is known for working with 4Kids Entertainment, DuArt Film and Video, NYAV Post and Central Park Media. He is best known for his roles of Tristan Taylor in Yu-Gi-Oh! Duel Monsters, Yusei Fudo in Yu-Gi-Oh! 5D's and Raphael from the 2003 TV series of Teenage Mutant Ninja Turtles.

Filmography

Anime

Animation

Live-action television

Video games

References

External links
 
 

Living people
American male video game actors
Male actors from New York City
Rutgers University alumni
20th-century American male actors
21st-century American male actors
1970 births